Fiona Ferro was the defending champion from 2019, when the event was last held, but lost to Clara Burel in the quarterfinals.

Tamara Zidanšek won her maiden WTA Tour singles title, defeating Burel in the final, 4–6, 7–6(7–5), 6–1.

Seeds

Draw

Finals

Top half

Bottom half

Qualifying

Seeds

Qualifiers

Draw

First qualifier

Second qualifier

Third qualifier

Fourth qualifier

References

External Links 
Main Draw
Qualifying Draw

Ladies Open Lausanne
WTA Swiss Open